Becontree is a London Underground station located to the south of Becontree in the London Borough of Barking and Dagenham, east London. It is in Travelcard Zone 5.

The station was renamed and completely rebuilt in 1932 with an additional pair of platforms to serve the electric District Railway (now the District line) local service. Main-line services ceased to call at the station in the 1960s, leaving only two platforms in operation.

History

In 1858 a line through East Ham was constructed to provide a faster connection between Barking and the city of London, which connects to the London and Blackwall Railway route to Fenchurch Street. Between 1885 and 1888, the London, Tilbury and Southend Railway (LT&SR) constructed a line between Barking and Pitsea via Upminster to provide a more direct route between the two cities. The station was not built at the time.

The London, Midland and Scottish Railway (LMSR) took ownership of the London, Tilbury and Southend line in 1923 and the station opened as Gale Street Halt on 28 June 1926 to serve the new Becontree Estate and subsequent residential areas. Initially, there were no roads leading to the station. In 1929, the company proposed quadrupling their line between Barking and Upminster and electrifying one pair of tracks for the District line. The station was rebuilt and new platforms were constructed for the new pair of tracks. Gale Street Halt was renamed as Becontree and the new station building to the designs of the architect William Henry Hamlyn opened on 18 July 1932, with electrified District line services starting operation 2 months after on 12 September. In addition to the start of electrified services, two new adjacent stations on the District line named Upney and Heathway (now Dagenham Heathway) opened.

By 1935, there were approximately 18,000 homes in this area, and together with developers, Dagenham Council added more than 5000 homes until 1965. By 1940, the population grew to 116,000. This particular section of the line between Barking and Upminster was popular among commuters getting to West and East Ham which reduced the need for bus services. Other reasons were a shortened travel time to Charing Cross of up to 35 minutes and the good availability of trains servicing this part of the line.

The slow tracks on the former LT&SR line to Upminster were shared with steam locomotive hauled goods and passenger services, until 1961 when the District line took over exclusive use of the DC electrified lines. LT&SR services ceased to stop at the station on 15 June 1962.

Becontree Estate Railway

The railway here was crossed by Becontree Estate Railway, a temporary railway constructed as part of the building of the Becontree housing estate which operated between 1921 and 1934. Becontree estate was constructed in the 1920s by C. J. Wills and Sons Ltd., with the remainder completed in 1938. The estate was once to be served by high speed tramways, with services starting from Ilford, branching out into the estate and then rejoining the current line to Barking. This was not supported by Ilford and Barking councils, and was abandoned due to problems with Ilford authorities and the need to electrify the Barking to Upminster line. There was also a deferred plan for a Kearney Monorail tube connecting Becontree to the city.

Design

The station has four platforms, of which two are used by the District line and another two are disused since the LT&SR service was withdrawn in 1962. One of the platforms is fenced off from the westbound District line platform. The single-storey brick station buildings are of typical 1930s design which are also constructed at Dagenham East, Hornchurch and Upminster at the time. Station refurbishment works were completed by Metronet in 2006, where heritage features were restored, CCTV equipment replaced and PA system enhanced. New wall tiles and ceilings were clad, and new tactile strips, customer Help Points and better lighting were installed. Whilst these works were done between 2005 and 2006, the station was closed on several weekends whereby replacement buses operated to Dagenham Heathway station.

Location
The station is located on the west side of Gale Street. It serves the residential area of Becontree, which is to the north of the station. There is a commercial area to the south of the station, while Parsloes Park is to the north. Nearby landmarks include a driving school, the Jo Richardson Community School, Roding Primary School and The James Campbell Primary School.

London Bus routes 62 and 145 serve the station.

Services
Becontree is on the Upminster part of the line between Upney and Dagenham Heathway. The typical off-peak service in trains per hour (tph) is:
12 tph eastbound to Upminster
6 tph westbound to Ealing Broadway
6 tph westbound to Richmond

In popular culture
The station is said to be haunted by a faceless woman with long blonde hair that several staff members have sighted. A possible connection to this could be that in 1958 there was a collision between two trains near Becontree Station that led to the deaths of 10 people.

Notes and references

Notes

References

Further reading

Former London, Midland and Scottish Railway stations
Railway stations in Great Britain opened in 1926
Railway stations in Great Britain opened in 1932
District line stations
Tube stations in the London Borough of Barking and Dagenham
William Henry Hamlyn buildings